Gerlinde Haid (born Hofer (19 April 1943 – 29 November 2012) was an Austrian folk music researcher.

Life 
She then studied music education and German language and literature at the University of Vienna. In 1965, she passed the teacher's examination and erwarb den Titel Magistra of philosophy. She also studied folklore and musicology at the University of Vienna and was awarded a doctorate in philosophy in 1976.

From 1994 until her retirement in 2011, she was full professor of the history and theory of folk music at the Hochschule (from 1998 University) für Musik und darstellende Kunst in Vienna. Her main field of research was folk music of the Alps.

Haid was the editor of the series "Schriften zur Volksmusik", which Walter Deutsch founded in 1970 and which are among the most well-founded publications of the subject in Austria. She also wrote numerous articles on musical customs and folk dances for the Oesterreichisches Musiklexikon.

Haid was married to the Tyrolean folklorist and dialect poet Hans Haid.

Haid died in Innsbruck at the age of 69.

Awards 
2003 wurde ihr vom Bundespräsidenten das Ehrenkreuz für Wissenschaft und Kunst I. Klasse überreicht. Im Jahr 2010, erhielt sie den Walter Deutsch Staatspreis, der vom Bundesministerium für Wissenschaft und Forschung alle zwei Jahre in Anerkennung besonderer Leistungen auf dem Gebiet der Volksmusikforschung verliehen wird.

Publications 
 with : Die schönsten Lieder Österreichs. Verlag Carl Ueberreuter, Wien/Heidelberg 1979, .
 Tanzbeschreibungen, Tanzforschung. Gesammelte Volkstanzstudien with Ilka Peter, Karl Horak, Gerald Riedler. Österreichisches Volksliedwerk / Österreichischer Bundesverlag, Vienna 1983.

References

External links 
 
Aufnahmen von und mit Gerlinde Haid im Onlinearchiv der Österreichischen Mediathek

Folk-song collectors
Austrian ethnomusicologists
Academic staff of the University of Music and Performing Arts Vienna
Austrian folk music
Recipients of the Austrian Cross of Honour for Science and Art, 1st class
1943 births
2012 deaths
People from Bad Aussee